Hosts is a 2001 thriller novel by F. Paul Wilson.

Written by F. Paul Wilson, Hosts is a thriller novel in the Repairman Jack series, and follows All the Rage.  In it, protagonist Jack investigates the cult that his sister's lover—Jeannette—has joined: the Unity.  Jeannette had received a tainted experimental viral vector treatment for a brain tumor; the virus gained sentience, is the driving factor behind the cult, and attempting to spread itself worldwide.  Further plots involve Jack's sister's coming out and Jack avoiding a journalist and any ensuing publicity.

Hosts was published by Forge on October 12, 2001.

Publishers Weekly anticipated Wilson's fans to enjoy the novel and the further humanization of Jack.

References

2001 American novels
English-language novels
Novels about viral outbreaks
Novels with lesbian themes
Repairman Jack (series)
Sentient objects in fiction
Sequel novels
American thriller novels